An Attic funerary relief, sometimes also known as the Mithridates funerary relief is displayed at the National Archaeological Museum of Athens (NAMA), with the inventory number 4464. Its date is uncertain.

Description

The Pentelic marble relief consists of two plates and there must have been a third piece on the left hand side, containing at least the tail of the horse. The central figure of the relief is a horse moving to the right, with its head pulled upwards away from the right edge of the relief. A portion of the horses nose is missing, the only substantial damage to the piece. Its left foreleg is raised and bent, the right is stretched out and planted firmly in the ground. The hind legs reinforce the horse's position, the left hind leg is in very low relief, only barely extending out of the surface. On the horse's back is a panther pelt, which is attached around its front. At the front, to its left, stands a stable boy who reaches up to strike the horse with a whip, as the pained posture of the horse's head makes clear. The boy wears a chiton. His hair is cut short, but the pattern of the locks indicates that he is an exotic foreigner. It is probably that he is an African slave, most likely from Ethiopia.

Arabs and Africans were depicted in Greek art from the fourth century BC. Other datings assign the relief to the first century BC. If one takes the earlier dating it is assumed that the relief belonged to a large grave naiskos; supporters of the later dating often connect it with the funerary monument of King Mithridates VI of Pontus.

Bibliography 
 Nikolaos Kaltsas, Sculpture in the National Archaeological Museum, Athens, The J. Paul Getty Museum, Los Angeles 2002 , p. 206.

External links 

 Relief mit Pferd und schwarzem Jüngling in the Arachne Archaeological Database.

Archaeological discoveries in Greece
National Archaeological Museum, Athens
Marble sculptures in Greece
Horses in art
Sculptures in Athens